The 2007 Appalachian State Mountaineers football team represented Appalachian State University in the 2007 NCAA Division I FCS football season. The team was coached by Jerry Moore and played their home games at Kidd Brewer Stadium in Boone, North Carolina.

The football team competes in the Division I Football Championship Subdivision (FCS), formerly I-AA, as a member of the Southern Conference. Appalachian is the only university  in North Carolina, public or private, to win a National Collegiate Athletic Association (NCAA) national championship in football. The Mountaineers won the 2005 Division I-AA Football Championship and repeated as FCS national champions in 2006 and 2007. They also captured a third consecutive Southern Conference Southern Conference title.

The team is one of only five from its division to ever defeat a team ranked in the Associated Press Poll (the others being Cincinnati in 1983, James Madison in 2010, Eastern Washington in 2013, and North Dakota State in 2016), in a game against Michigan that was hailed as one of the biggest upsets in the history of American sports. Additionally, two players from the 2007 team were selected in the 2008 NFL Draft: wide receiver Dexter Jackson (Tampa Bay Buccaneers) and safety Corey Lynch (Cincinnati Bengals).

Schedule

Game summaries

Michigan

.

Appalachian State opened the season on  September 1 at Michigan Stadium on the campus of the University of Michigan in Ann Arbor, Michigan. It pitted the homestanding Michigan Wolverines against the two-time defending champions of the Division I FCS, the Appalachian State Mountaineers. In what was hailed as one of the biggest upsets in the history of American sports, the Mountaineers shocked the fifth-ranked Wolverines 34–32. It is believed to be only the first win ever by a team in Division I FCS (still frequently known by its former name of Division I-AA) over a ranked team in Division I FBS (formerly Division I-A) since the NCAA split its Division I into two football subdivisions in 1978.

Following the game, the Associated Press made FCS schools eligible to receive vote in the AP Poll that ranks college football teams; the poll was previously limited to FBS teams. On September 9, Appalachian State received 19 points and was 33rd in overall voting in the AP Poll. In the final AP Poll of the 2007 season issued in January 2008, Appalachian State earned five points, good enough for a tie at 34th place and making Appalachian State the first non-FBS program to receive votes in a season-ending AP Poll.

Lenoir–Rhyne

The Mountaineers returned home after the Michigan win for their first contest at Kidd Brewer Stadium against Division II Lenoir–Rhyne on September 8. In front of a record crowd of 28,802, senior quarterback Trey Elder started the game, filling in for an injured Armanti Edwards, and threw for 210 yards and rushed for 90 more. The Mountaineers scored touchdowns on their first five possessions en route to racking up 403 yards of offense. The Bears were limited to 195 total yards. Freshman linebacker D. J. Smith lead the defense with 12 tackles. With the win, the Mountaineers extended their Division I leading win streak to 16 games and their home winning streak to 28 games.

Northern Arizona

A crowd of 27,104 packed Kidd Brewer Stadium to see the Mountaineers put up 429 yards of offense in a win over Northern Arizona. The win was the 17th straight overall and 29th straight home victory. Trey Elder, starting in place of an injured Armanti Edwards, accounted for 298 yards. Running back Kevin Richardson set a career-high with seven receptions for 122 yards and two touchdowns. Lumberjack quarterback Lance Kriesien paced the Northern Arizona offense with 171 passing and 129 rushing yards.

Wofford

A crowd of 11,042, the fourth largest in Gibbs Stadium history, saw the Terriers end the Mountaineers Division I leading winning streak at 17 games, 42–31. The Terriers outgained the Mountaineers 431 to 320 in total yardage with running back Kevious Johnson accounting for 104 rushing yards. Armanti Edwards, starting in his first game since the Michigan win, re-injured his shoulder at the start of the second half. Trey Elder replaced Edwards and threw for 105 and rushed for 33 yards. Senior wide receiver Hans Batichon had a career-high six receptions for 93 yards. The only other bright spot for the Mountaineers was CoCo Hillary's 95-yard kickoff return for a touchdown in the second quarter.

Elon

The Mountaineers moved to 15–0 when running back Kevin Richardson rushes for 100 or more yards with a 49–32 win over Elon. The crowd of 13,100 was the largest in Rhodes Stadium history. Appalachian outgained Elon 526 to 371 yards with 356 yards coming from a potent ground attack. The Mountaineer defense also played an impressive game, sacking Elon freshman quarterback Scott Riddle five times. Corey Lynch blocked a Phoenix punt in second quarter and had an interception late in the game to help seal the victory.

Gardner–Webb

A record homecoming crowd of 27,428 witnessed the Mountaineers rout the Bulldogs of Gardner–Webb 45–7. Kevin Richardson's four second-quarter touchdowns put the game away early. On the day, the Mountaineers outgained the Bulldogs 466–211 in total yardage to extend their home-winning streak to 30 games.

Georgia Southern

Appalachian State suffered its second loss of the year in a defeat to the Eagles of Georgia Southern, 38–35. The loss also ended the 30 game home winning streak compiled by the Mountaineers since a playoff defeat to Maine in 2002. The Eagles were led by future Walter Payton Award winner Jayson Foster. Foster lined up as quarterback, running back, and wide receiver and finished with 14 passing, 175 rushing and 41 receiving yards. Armanti Edwards made only his third start of the season, and first since September 22, and became the first quarterback in Appalachian history to rush for over 200 yards. Trailing 38–20 with less than eight minutes left to play, a Mountaineer rally came up short as Edwards fell one yard shy of converting on fourth down.

Furman

Rebounding from the loss against Georgia Southern, the Mountaineers held on to defeat the Furman Paladins 34–27 in Greenville, South Carolina. The Mountaineers jumped out to a 24–7 lead at halftime only to see the Paladins roar back with 20 points in the second half. Appalachian rolled up 511 yards of offense with Armanti Edwards finishing with 337 total yards and Kevin Richardson adding 124 yards on 21 carries. Richardson become just the second player in ASU history with 4,000 career rushing yards. The game was sealed on a late Corey Lynch interception on the goal line.

The Citadel

Armanti Edwards rushed for a school record of 291 yards, leading the Mountaineers to a 45–24 victory over The Citadel Bulldogs in Johnson Hagood Stadium. The victory moved the Mountaineers into a virtual tie for first place with Wofford.

Western Carolina

The Mountaineers had their highest offensive output in 71 years in a 79–35 rout over the Catamounts of Western Carolina. The crowd of 27,977 was the largest to ever witness the Battle for the Old Mountain Jug. The victory gave the Mountaineers a 53–18–1 series lead over their archrivals from Cullowhee and a 24–6 advantage since the introduction of the Old Mountain Jug. Appalachian's 743 yards of offense was the second highest in school history after the 788 gained in a 115–0 win against Piedmont in 1936. Kevin Richardson rushed for a career-high 215 yards and Armanti Edwards added 295 through the air. The Mountaineers also had a season high four interceptions and were never forced to punt.

Chattanooga

Kevin Richard became the Appalachian's all-time leading rusher, breaking John Settle's record, in a 37–17 victory over the Chattanooga Mocs. The Mountaineers also claimed a share of the Southern Conference title, their third straight.

James Madison

A forced fumble with 22 seconds left in the game gave the Mountaineers a 28–27 win over James Madison. The Dukes controlled the game in practically every statistical category, most notably the time of possession, which was over 40 minutes. James Madison's quarterback, Rodney Landers, led the Dukes with 253 yards of total offense. Armanti Edwards accounted for 258 total yards of offense for the Mountaineers. The Mountaineers were down 27–22 with less than two minutes remaining in the game and facing fourth down. Edwards found the end zone after completing a pass to Devon Moore to put the Mountaineers ahead 28–27. On the ensuing possession, the Dukes drove 62 yards down the field to put themselves within easy field goal range. James Madison head coach Mickey Matthews made the decision to run one more play which resulted in a fumble. Defensive end Gary Tharrington knocked the ball from the grasp of the Dukes' running back, Jamal Sullivan, and it was recovered by linebacker Pierre Banks to give the Mountaineers an improbable win in front of 14,040 fans at Kidd Brewer Stadium.

Eastern Washington

Armanti Edwards accounted for 347 yards of offense and three touchdowns in leading the Mountaineers to a 38–35 victory over the Eastern Washington Eagles. Safety Corey Lynch led the defense with an interception, fumble recovery and a blocked field goal in limiting Eastern Washington's passing attack by more than 120 yards off their season average. The victory tied the Mountaineers with the Eagles of Georgia Southern as the only two programs to have 10 consecutive postseason wins in contiguous years.

Richmond

A record FCS postseason crowd of 24,140 packed Kidd Brewer Stadium to see the Mountaineers defeat the Richmond Spiders 55–35 on December 7, 2007. Armanti Edwards racked up 313 yards on the ground, setting a Division I record for rushing by a quarterback in the win. He accounted for seven touchdowns (four rushing and three passing) and 495 of the Mountaineers 617 total yards. Appalachian jumped out to an early 35–14 lead only to see the Spiders tie up the game in the third quarter. The Mountaineers responded with 20 straight points capped with an interception by senior safety Corey Lynch. With the win, Appalachian became just the fifth program in FCS history to advance to three-consecutive national title games, joining Eastern Kentucky (1979–82), Georgia Southern (1988–90 and 1998–2000), Marshall (1991–93) and Youngstown State (1991–94).

Delaware

Entering their third consecutive national championship game, the Mountaineers were looking to become the first team to win three in a row at the FCS (I-AA) level since the playoffs began in 1978. The Blue Hens of Delaware stood in the way of history. Senior running back Kevin Richardson led the way for the Mountaineers with 111 yards rushing and 27 receiving, finishing his career as Appalachian's all-time leading rusher with 4,797 yards. Accounting for three passing touchdowns, Armanti Edwards threw for 198 yards and rushed for another 98. The Blue Hens offensive attack was paced by future National Football League first round draft pick Joe Flacco at quarterback, who threw for 334 yards and one touchdown. Trey Elder, in his last game in black and gold, finished the scoring for the Mountaineers with a 53-yard scamper to make the score 49–14. Armanti Edwards finished the season with 1,948 yards passing and 1,587 yards rushing. He was 52 passing yards short of becoming only the second player in NCAA history to pass for 2,000 yards and rush for 1,000 twice. The record attendance of 23,010 on hand at Finley Stadium was the largest neutral site crowd for the NCAA Division I Championship Game.

Roster

Coaching staff

Ranking movements
AP Poll

FCS polls

Awards and honors
 Southern Conference Defensive Player of the Year (coaches and media) — Corey Lynch
 Southern Conference Jacobs Blocking Trophy — Kerry Brown

Statistics

Team

Scores by quarter

References

External links
 

Appalachian State
Appalachian State Mountaineers football seasons
NCAA Division I Football Champions
Southern Conference football champion seasons
Appalachian State Mountaineers football